The Loma de León Natural Monument Also Loma de León Is a natural protected area located in the municipality of Iribarren, belonging to the state of Lara, Venezuela. It received the status of national monument on February 2, 1987.

The landscape is semi-arid, it is possible to emphasize the watchtower on the valley of the river Turbio and the locality of Barquisimeto, located at a height of 1,300 m in an area known as Loma de León, formed predominantly by quartzite rocks.

Representatives of the animal kingdom include the báquiro, matacan deer, fox, wildcat, rabbit, partridge, in addition to some species in danger of extinction. Protecting this environment ensures the preservation of the scenarios of natural monuments and the water courses that flow into the banks of the river Turbio.

See also
List of national parks of Venezuela
Cerro Platillón Natural Monument

References

Natural monuments of Venezuela
Protected areas established in 1987